Large Island is an islet between Grenada and Carriacou (Grenadines). It is part of Carriacou and Petite Martinique, a dependency of Grenada.

Uninhabited islands of Grenada